Equus mauritanicus, the Saharan zebra, is an extinct species of equine which lived in North Africa during the Late Pleistocene and possibly the Holocene, as recently as 6,000 years ago.

E. mauritanicus has in the past been considered synonymous with the living plains zebra (E. quagga), but examination of several skulls show it to be distinct.

References

Pleistocene horses
Zebras
Pleistocene mammals of Africa
Holocene extinctions
Fossil taxa described in 1897